"Donna non vidi mai" ("I have never seen a woman") is a tenor aria from the act 1 of Giacomo Puccini's opera, Manon Lescaut. The aria is sung by Des Grieux to a beautiful young lady, Manon Lescaut, who is destined for a convent at the will of her father. Des Grieux sings this aria of his feelings for her.

This scene takes place at a square near to the Paris gate in Amiens, France, somewhere in the 18th century.

Libretto
Donna non vidi mai, simile a questa!	
A dirle: "io t'amo," 			
a nuova vita l'alma mia si desta.	
"Manon Lescaut  mi chiamo"		
Come queste parole profumate,  		
mi vagan nello spirto. 			
e ascose fibre vanno a carezzare.	
O sussurro gentil,			
deh, non cessar!			

I have never seen a woman, such as this one!
To tell her: " I love you",
my soul awakens to a new life.
"Manon Lescaut is my name."
How these fragrant words, 
wander around in my mind.
And come to caress my innermost fibers.
Oh! sweet thoughts,
Ah, do not cease!

References

External links
 Manon Lescaut arias at the Aria Database site.
 , Placido Domingo

Arias by Giacomo Puccini
Opera excerpts